Paul Warner may refer to:

 Paul Warner (director), American film and theatre director
 Paul Warner (judge), federal magistrate judge for the United States District Court for the District of Utah